"Panic Button" was an American television play broadcast on November 28, 1957, as part of the second season of the CBS television series Playhouse 90. Rod Serling wrote the teleplay. Franklin Schaffner directed, Martin Manulis was the producer, and Dominick Dunne was the executive assistant. Robert Stack, Vera Miles, and Lee J. Cobb starred.

Plot
The investigation into a plane crash concludes that it was caused by pilot error. At the inquiry, the co-pilot (Robert Stack) seeks to place the blame on the captain who died in the crash. In the end, the co-pilot is found to have been responsible for the crash, and his pilot's license is revoked.

Reception
Television reviewer Harriet Van Horne praised Serling's story and cited it as proof that television drama had grown up, no longer having the need for a happy ending. She also praised the performances of Stack, Cobb, Seldes and Miles as valiant and true.

San Francisco Examiner reviewer Dwight Nelson praised the performances of Cobb and Stack but opined that Serling's story was "neither dull nor exciting. Just average for this year's "Playhouse 90" plays which have been distinguished for length than for content."

Cast
The following performers received screen credit for their performances:

 Robert Stack - Jerry Cook
 Vera Miles - Carolyn Cook
 Lee J. Cobb - Al Bengsten
 Leif Erickson - Paul Henderson
 Marian Seldes - Kate Sullivan

References

1957 television plays
1957 American television episodes
Playhouse 90 (season 2) episodes